Mount Isarog is an active stratovolcano located in the province of Camarines Sur, Philippines, on the island of Luzon. The mountain has active fumaroles and hot springs.

The broad isthmus between Lagonoy Gulf and San Miguel Bay is occupied by the isolated Mount Isarog volcano. 

The volcano has a 2,500 m (8202 ft) crater that is breached to the east along a narrow valley drained by the Cabongaan water stream. A major debris avalanche deposit extends northwest to the coast and into San Miguel Bay. 

The peak of the mountain marks the point where the borders of six municipalities and one city meet (listed in clockwise direction, starting north): Goa, Tigaon, Ocampo, Pili, Naga City, Tinambac and Calabanga.

Mount Isarog was where local troops of the Philippine Army and Constabulary units and Bicolano guerrillas hid during the Japanese Occupation. In the 1970s, with the leadership of Romulo Jallores and his brother, they established the New People's Army in the Bicol region at the foot of this mountain.

History

Indigenous history 
Mount Isarog has been the ancestral territory of the indigenous Isarog Agta people for thousands of years prior to the arrival of the Spanish. They are one of the first inhabitants in the entire Philippines and are of Negrito origin. They are a group of Aeta people with a distinct language and heritage unique from others.

Legal history 
It was made a public land through the Proclamation No. 157 on March 28, 2015.

On August 17, 1935, General Frank Murphy established the Mt. Isarog Forest Reserve which reduced the size of the area to 10,112. But it was revoked by President Manuel L. Quezon when he signed Proclamation No. 293 titled "Establishment of Mt. Isarog as a National Park."

The Earth Summit of 1992 prompted the creation of the National Integrated Protected Area Programme. A five-year (1995-2001) intervention plan was enacted. On June 20, 2002, by virtue of Proclamation No. 214, Mt. Isarog became a protected area under the natural park.

Eruption history 
Pyroclastic flows originating from lava dome collapses have occurred during the Holocene, one of which has a calibrated radiocarbon date of about 3,500 BCE. In 2020, a group of geologists from Partido State University discovered that Isarog also erupted around 4,300 years ago after a charcoal overlain by thick block-and-ash flow deposits was found. The charcoal was sent to the United States for radiocarbon dating. This new information about the eruptive history of Isarog was presented at the 2020 Virtual GeoCon, a convention of geologists organized by the Geological Society of the Philippines. Currently, Isarog vent displays gas seepages, warm springs, and steaming vents.

Seismic history 
On 8 November 1915, frequent earthquakes were felt on and around Isarog volcano, with some occasional noises. Landslides occurred on the slopes of Isarog volcano. The seismic swarm repeated itself 2 or 3 times at long intervals until 10 January 1916. The volcano was thickly wooded, even inside of the crater, and nobody observed any fumaroles.

Ethnic groups

Isarog Agta Tribe 
The Isarog Agta people live within the circumference of Mount Isarog, though only 5 of them still know their indigenous language. They are one of the original Negrito settlers in the entire Philippines. They belong to the Aeta people classification, but have distinct language and belief systems unique to their own culture and heritage.

In 2010, UNESCO released its 3rd world volume of Endangered Languages in the World, where 3 critically endangered languages were in the Philippines. One of these languages in the Isarog Agta language which has an estimated speaker of 5 people in the year 2000. The language was classified as Critically Endangered, meaning the youngest speakers are grandparents and older, and they speak the language partially and infrequently and hardly pass the language to their children and grandchildren anymore. If the remaining 150 people do not pass their native language to the next generation of Isarog Agta people, their indigenous language will be extinct within a period of 1 to 2 decades.

Biodiversity 

Mt. Isarog has a rich diversity. It displays four major types of natural habitat or vegetation: from the warm grassland and lowland forest to the wet and cool climate of montane forest.

The lowland forest is noted for its tall canopy. The uppermost layer towers between 30–40 meters and sometimes even reach 60 meters. Many of these trees belong to the dipterocarp family. The second canopy layer (between 23–30 meters) has the sustain bamboos (Bambusa), arborescent palms (Calamus), climbing bamboo (Schizostacyum), climbing pandans (Freycinetia) and vascular epiphytes such as orchids and ferns.

The grassland (parang) is dominated by cogon (Imperata cylindrica) and talahib (Saccharum ovatum) grasses. The topography and soil condition of the area limits the growth of trees, giving rise to the grassland.

The montane forest has two-oken because layered canopy trees ranging from 12–25 meters with noticeable canopy gaps due to the absence of large trees.

The mossy forest has a canopy with a small height of 2 to 6 meters only. The canopy is broken because of the high winds and steep terrain. It is inhabited by bamboo, pandan, orchids, ferns, pitcher plants and other epiphytes. Trees at this level are covered with moss.

Endemic 
Isarog Shrew rat (Rhynchomys isarogensis) was first discovered in 1988 in Mount Isarog. Although it has no direct economic value, its presence in Mount Isarog is a barometer of wealth and management of its natural resources. It is now listed as endangered in the Red Data Book of the International Union for Conservation of Nature.

Mount Isarog is included as a protected area, home to endemic rodents (Archboldomys luzonensis, Chrotomys gonzalesi and Rhynchomys isarogensis), other endemic mammals, and 15 bird species endemic to Luzon.

Isarog Cloud Frog was first described by scientists in 1997. In total, scientists have identified one and possibly three new frog species, 8 species of snakes, and 19 species of lizards.

Mount Isarog also has the rare Mount Isarog Forest Skink (Sphenomorphus knollmanae) that is endemic.

Gallery

See also
 List of active volcanoes in the Philippines
 List of potentially active volcanoes in the Philippines
 List of inactive volcanoes in the Philippines
 List of protected areas of the Philippines
 Philippine Institute of Volcanology and Seismology
 Pacific ring of fire

References

External links
 
 Phivolcs' Mount Isarog page
 "Mount Isarog, Philippines" on Peakbagger

Mountains of the Philippines
Volcanoes of Luzon
Stratovolcanoes of the Philippines
Mount Isarog
Potentially active volcanoes of the Philippines
Landforms of Camarines Sur
Holocene stratovolcanoes